Ashley Battersby is a female American professional freestyle skier originally from Chicago, IL who now resides in Park City, UT. Ashley has had a considerable amount of success so far in her young career, winning slopestyle in the 2008 U.S. Open, slopestyle in the 2010 Aspen Open, and grabbing her first X-Games medal in 2010. In 2012, the Association of Freeskiing Professionals ranked Ashley 4th overall among women freestyle skiers.

References 

1988 births
Living people
American female freestyle skiers
Sportspeople from Chicago
University of Utah alumni
People from Park City, Utah
21st-century American women